The grand roundleaf bat (Hipposideros grandis), also known as the grand leaf-nosed bat, is a species of bat in the genus Hipposideros. It can be found in China, Myanmar, Thailand, and Vietnam.

Taxonomy
Per George Henry Hamilton Tate, it was described as a new taxon in 1936 by American zoologist Glover Morrill Allen.
Allen listed it as a subspecies of the intermediate roundleaf bat (Hipposideros larvatus). The holotype was collected in Chindwin, Myanmar. It was frequently listed as a subspecies until 2006, when analyses of its echolocation and morphology demonstrated that the grand roundleaf bat is distinct enough to be considered a full species.

Description
Males weigh , while females weigh . In India, the species has a peak echolocation frequency of 98 kHz, which helps distinguish it from other Hipposideros species.

Range and habitat
This species is found in several countries in Asia, including China, Myanmar, Thailand, and Vietnam. It is also found in India.

Conservation
As of 2016, it is evaluated as a least-concern species by the IUCN. It meets the criteria for this classification because it has a wide geographic range, it is relatively abundant in Vietnam, and it tolerates some human disturbance to its habitat.

References

Hipposideros
Mammals of China
Mammals of Thailand
Mammals of Vietnam
Mammals described in 1936
Taxa named by Glover Morrill Allen